CPRT may refer to:

 Cancer Prevention Research Trust
 Copart, auction company based in Texas
 Cypriot syllabary, ISO 15924 code